Perhaps  may refer to:

 Perhaps (album), the fourth album released by the Scottish New Wave band Associates
 "Quizás, Quizás, Quizás", "Perhaps, Perhaps, Perhaps" in English, a popular song
 Perhaps, English title of the 1999 French science fiction film Peut-être

See also
 Probably (disambiguation)